Qarah Yasar or Qareh Yasar may refer to:
 Qarah Yasar-e Bala, a village in Zavkuh Rural District, Pishkamar District, Kalaleh County, Golestan Province, Iran
 Qarah Yasar-e Pain, a village in Zavkuh Rural District, Pishkamar District, Kalaleh County, Golestan Province, Iran